Stanley "Docker" Winmill (5 May 1889 – 25 June 1940) was a Welsh international rugby union player who played club rugby for Cross Keys and county rugby for Monmouthshire. He won four caps for Wales, playing in all four matches of the 1921 Five Nations Championship.

Rugby career
Winmill was a one club player, remaining with Cross Keys for his entire career. He captained the club on two occasions, in 1912-13 and for a three-year period between 1919-1922. His brother Joe was a notable player for Abertillery and both brothers were selected to play at county level for Monmouthshire. Winmill surpassed his brother Joseph in 1921 when he was selected for international duty, brought into the Wales team for the 1921 Five Nations Championship. His first match was against England at Twickenham, brought into the front row. The game ended in a solid win for England, Wales losing 18-3. His next match, at home against Scotland, also ended in a loss. Despite two losses on a run the Welsh selectors kept faith with Winmill and the final two matches of the tournament, at home to France and away to Ireland, both ended in Welsh victories.

International matches played
Wales
  1921
  1921
  1921
  1921

Personal life
Winmill was born in Bedwellty in Monmouthshire. A collier by trade, he worked down the Nine Mile Point Colliery and in 1935 he was one of the 164 men who took part in the stay-down strike against scab labour. As a collier he lost an eye in an industrial accident, and later became a police officer working at his old colliery. In 1940 he tripped over a rail at the mine and injured his head in the fall, dying from the wound on 25 June.

Bibliography

References

1889 births
1940 deaths
Cross Keys RFC players
Monmouthshire County RFC players
Rugby union players from Bedwellty
Rugby union props
Wales international rugby union players
Welsh miners
Welsh police officers
Welsh rugby union players
Officers in Welsh police forces